Paramontana rufozonata, common name red-zoned turrid, is a species of sea snail, a marine gastropod mollusk in the family Raphitomidae.

Description
The length of the shell attains 5 mm.

(Original description) The fusiformly turreted, solid shell is white, sometimes with a zone of double interrupted chestnut lines near the base of the body whorl, similar chestnut markings being occasionally apparent here and there near the upper portion of the whorls. The shell contains 6 whorls, convex, longitudinally ribbed and crossed with transverse ridges that become sharply 
and prominently nodulous upon the ribs. The spire is sharp with a light brown apex. The aperture is narrowly quadrate. The outer lip is varicose and denticulated. The posterior sinus is moderate. 

(Discussion as Pseudodaphnella rufozonata by Charles Hedley) By G. B. Sowerby  this species was united to P. tincta Reeve, and to P. albifuniculata Reeve, an arrangement copied by Pritchard and Gatliff. But P. rufozonata is only two-thirds the height of P. tincta, is of a more slender build, and lacks the peculiar excavate base of that tropical species. The latter feature is shown in Reeve's figure, and is mentioned by Hervier  as the " depression circulaire autour de son canal basal." The records by Melvill and Standen  and by Bouge and Dautzenberg  of P. rufozonata, from the Loyalty Islands, are doubtless due to the confusion between this and P. tincta. P. rufozonata is indeed more nearly related to P. albifuniculata Reeve, but is smaller, more fusiform, and has the radials more prominent owing to the spirals being slighter. A more distant
relation is P. barnardi, easily separable by the heavier sculpture and striking colour pattern.

Distribution
This marine species is endemic to Australia and occurs off New South Wales, South Australia, Tasmania and Victoria.

References

 Verco, J.C. 1909. Notes on South Australian marine Mollusca with descriptions of new species. Part XII. Transactions of the Royal Society of South Australia 33: 293–342 
 Laseron, C. 1954. Revision of the New South Wales Turridae (Mollusca). Australian Zoological Handbook. Sydney : Royal Zoological Society of New South Wales pp. 56, pls 1–12
 Powell, A.W.B. 1966. The molluscan families Speightiidae and Turridae, an evaluation of the valid taxa, both Recent and fossil, with list of characteristic species. Bulletin of the Auckland Institute and Museum. Auckland, New Zealand 5: 1–184, pls 1–23

External links
  Hedley, C. 1922. A revision of the Australian Turridae. Records of the Australian Museum 13(6): 213-359, pls 42-56  
 
 Grove, S.J. (2018). A Guide to the Seashells and other Marine Molluscs of Tasmania: Paramontana rufozonata

rufozonata
Gastropods described in 1877
Gastropods of Australia